Obukhiv Raion is a raion (district) in Kyiv Oblast of Ukraine. Its administrative center is Obukhiv. Population: .

On 18 July 2020, as part of the administrative reform of Ukraine, the number of raions of Kyiv Oblast was reduced to seven, and the area of Obukhiv Raion was significantly expanded. Two abolished raions, Kaharlyk and Myronivka Raions, as well as Obukhiv Municipality, the cities of Vasylkiv and Rzhyshchiv, which were previously incorporated as cities of oblast significance, and parts of Bohuslav, Kyiv-Sviatoshyn, and Vasylkiv Raions, were merged into Obukhiv Raion. The January 2020 estimate of the raion population was

Subdivisions

Current
After the reform in July 2020, the raion consisted of 9 hromadas:
 Bohuslav urban hromada with the administration in the city of Bohuslav, transferred from Bohuslav Raion;
 Feodosiivska rural hromada with the administration in the selo of Khodosivka, transferred from Kyiv-Sviatoshyn Raion; 
 Kaharlyk urban hromada with the administration in the city of Kaharlyk, transferred from Kaharlyk Raion;
 Kozyn settlement hromada with the administration in the urban-type settlement of Kozyn, retained from Obukhiv Raion;
 Myronivka urban hromada with the administration in the city of Myronivka, transferred from Myronivka Raion;
 Obukhiv urban hromada, with the administration in the city of Obukhiv, transferred from Obukhiv Municipality;  
 Rzhyshchiv urban hromada, with the administration in the city of Rzhyshchiv, transferred from the city of oblast significance of Rzhyshchiv;   
 Ukrainka urban hromada with the administration in the city of Ukrainka, retained from Obukhiv Raion;
 Vasylkiv urban hromada, with the administration in the city of Vasylkiv, transferred from the city of oblast significance of Vasylkiv and Vasylkiv Raion.

Before 2020

Before the 2020 reform, the raion consisted of two hromadas, 
 Kozyn settlement hromada with the administration in Kozyn;
 Ukrainka urban hromada with the administration in Ukrainka.

References

External links

Raions of Kyiv Oblast
Kyiv metropolitan area
1966 establishments in Ukraine
Obukhiv Raion